The Sega Pico, also known as  is an educational video game console by Sega Toys. Marketed as "edutainment", the main focus of the Pico was educational video games for children between 3 and 7 years old. The Pico was released in June 1993 in Japan and November 1994 in North America and Europe, later reaching China. It was succeeded by the Advanced Pico Beena, which was released in Japan in 2005. Though the Pico was sold continuously in Japan through the release of the Beena, in North America and Europe the Pico was less successful and was discontinued in early 1998, later being re-released by Majesco Entertainment. Releases for the Pico were focused on education for children and included titles supported by licensed franchised animated characters, including Sega's own Sonic the Hedgehog series. Overall, Sega claims sales of 3.4 million Pico consoles and 11.2 million game cartridges, and over 350,000 Beena consoles and 800,000 cartridges.

Design and software 

Powered by the same hardware used in the Sega Genesis, the physical shape of the Pico was designed to appear similar to a laptop. Included in the Pico is a stylus called the "Magic Pen", and a pad to draw on. Controlling the games for the system is accomplished either by using the Magic Pen like a mouse, or by pressing the directional buttons on the console. The Pico does not include a screen, and instead must be connected to a monitor through the Composite video output. Touching the pen to the pad allows drawing, or moving/animating a character on the screen.

Cartridges for the system were referred to as "Storyware", and took the form of picture books with a cartridge slot on the bottom. The Pico changes the television display and the set of tasks for the player to accomplish each time a page is turned. Sound, including voices and music, also accompanied every page. Games for the Pico focused on education, including subjects such as music, counting, spelling, reading, matching, and coloring. Titles included licensed animated characters from various franchises, such as Disney's The Lion King: Adventures at Pride Rock and A Year at Pooh Corner. Sega also released titles including their mascot, Sonic the Hedgehog, including Sonic Gameworld and Tails and the Music Maker.

According to former Sega console hardware research and development head Hideki Sato, the development of the Sega Pico was possible due to the company's past work on the MyCard cartridges developed for the SG-1000, as well as on drawing tablets.  The sensor technology used in the pad came from that developed for the 1987 arcade game World Derby, while its CPU and graphics chip came from the Genesis.

History 
In North America, Sega unveiled the Pico at the 1994 American International Toy Fair, showcasing its drawing and display abilities ahead of its release in November. The Pico's slogan was "The computer that thinks it's a toy." The Sega Pico won a few awards, including the "National Parenting Seal of Approval", a "Platinum Seal Award", and a gold medal from the "National Association of Parenting Publications Awards".

After a lack of success, Sega discontinued the Pico in North America in early 1998.

In early 1995, Sega of America reported that it had sold 400,000 units in North America. In 2000, Sega claimed that the Pico had sold  units. As of April 2005, Sega claims that  Pico consoles and  software cartridges had been sold worldwide. The Pico was recognized in 1995 by being listed on Dr. Toy's 100 Best Products, as well as being listed in Child as one of the best computer games available. According to Joseph Szadkowski of The Washington Times, "Pico has enough power to be a serious learning aid that teaches counting, spelling, matching, problem-solving, memory, logic, hand/eye coordination and important, basic computer skills." Former Sega of America vice president of product development Joe Miller claims that he named his dog after the system because of his passion for the console. By contrast, Steven L. Kent claims that Sega of Japan CEO Hayao Nakayama watched the Pico "utterly fail" in North America.

Advanced Pico Beena 

The Advanced Pico Beena, also known simply as Beena or BeenaLite, is an educational console system targeted at young children sold by Sega Toys, released in 2005 in Japan. It is the successor to the Pico, and marketed around the "learn while playing" concept. According to Sega Toys, the focus of the Advanced Pico Beena is on learning in a new social environment, and is listed as their upper-end product. Topics listed as being educational focuses for the Beena include intellectual, moral, physical, dietary, and safety education. The name of the console was chosen to sound like the first syllables of "Be Natural".

Compared to the Pico, Beena adds several functions. Beena can be played without a television, and supports multiplayer via a separately sold additional Magic Pen. The console also supports data saving. Playtime can be limited by settings in the system. Some games for the Beena offer adaptive difficulty, becoming more difficult to play based on the skill level of the player. The Beena Lite, a more affordable version of the console, was released on July 17, 2008. As of 2010, Sega estimated that 4.1 million Beena consoles had been sold, along with 20 million game cartridges.

See also 

 List of Sega Pico games

Notes

References

External links
  - Sega of America
 Pasopico Land - Sega of Japan 

Pico
1990s toys
Products introduced in 1993
Products introduced in 1994
Products and services discontinued in 1998
Products and services discontinued in 2005
Fourth-generation video game consoles
Advanced Pico Beena
68k-based game consoles
ARM-based video game consoles